Museum of Broadcasting may refer to:
The Paley Center for Media
Museum of Broadcast Communications
Pavek Museum of Broadcasting